Anabela Joaquim (born 5 May 1967) is an Angolan handball player.

She competed at the 1996 Summer Olympics, where Angola placed 7th.

References

External links
 

1967 births
Living people
Angolan female handball players
Olympic handball players of Angola
Handball players at the 1996 Summer Olympics